The British Junior Open squash championship is considered the second most prestigious junior open squash championship after the World Junior Squash Championships. It is one of the five Tier 2 events in the WSF World Junior Squash Circuit. British Junior Open is divided into ten categories — Boys Under-19, Boys Under-17, Boys Under-15, Boys Under-13, Boys Under-11, Girls Under-19, Girls Under-17, Girls Under-15, Girls Under-13, and Girls Under-11.

The Under-19 boys category was known as the Drysdale Cup before 1999; the Under-16 and Under-14 categories were both held prior to 1999, until being replaced by Under-15 and Under-17 categories respectively. The Under-13 categories were also introduced in the same year. The tournament moved to Birmingham from 2018 onwards, where the Under-11 categories were introduced.

List of winners by category (Boys)

Prior to 1999

After 1999

Boys' champions by country since 1999
As of 2023 edition.

List of winners by category (Girls)

Prior to 1999

After 1999

Girls' champions by country since 1999
As of 2023 edition.

Note:1) The 2000 edition for both boys and girls was held in December 1999.

See also
 British Open
 World Junior Squash Circuit
 World Junior Squash Championships
 US Junior Open squash championship
 French Junior Open Squash
 Dutch Junior Open Squash
 European Squash Federation
 England Squash & Racketball
 World Open

References

External links
British Junior Open official website
British Junior Open history on Squashsite

 
Squash tournaments in the United Kingdom
Squash records and statistics
Youth sport in the United Kingdom
Sport in Sheffield
Sports competitions in Sheffield